Puraini is a village development committee in Banke District in Lumbini Province of south-western Nepal. At the time of the 1991 Nepal census it had a population of 2636 and had 512 houses in the village. Now, it is a part of Nepalgunj sub-metropolitan city.

References

Populated places in Banke District